Dag Coward (1910–2000) was a Norwegian economist who served as the fourth rector of the Norwegian School of Economics (NHH) from 1964-1972.

Born in Kristiansand he studied at the University of Oslo, where he took the economics exam in 1931.

He was appointed Knight of the Order of St. Olav.

References

1910 births
2000 deaths
University of Oslo alumni
Academic staff of the Norwegian School of Economics
Rectors of the Norwegian School of Economics
People from Kristiansand
20th-century  Norwegian economists